Halakura College, is a general degree college situated at Mahamayahat under Agomani Block in Dhubri district, Assam. This college is affiliated with the Gauhati University. This college offers different bachelor's degree courses in arts.

References

External links

Universities and colleges in Assam
Colleges affiliated to Gauhati University
Dhubri district
Educational institutions in India with year of establishment missing